John Joseph Johannson (born October 18, 1961 in Rochester) is a retired American ice hockey center. He played for the United States at the 1981 World Junior Championships. Johannson was drafted by the Colorado Rockies in the 10th round, 192nd overall in the 1981 NHL entry draft. Following his senior year at the University of Wisconsin, his second consecutive 20 goal season, Johannson played 5 games with the New Jersey Devils in the NHL. The following season Johannson played for Wiener EV in Austria's second tier Nationalliga scoring 84 points in 23 games. Johannson retired after playing one year in Austria and went into the real estate business.

Johannson was the oldest of three children to Ken Johannson and Marietta Sand. His father and his younger brother Jim Johannson, both served terms as general manager of the United States men's national ice hockey team.

Career statistics

Regular season and playoffs

International

References

External links

1961 births
Living people
American men's ice hockey centers
Colorado Rockies (NHL) draft picks
Ice hockey players from Minnesota
NCAA men's ice hockey national champions
New Jersey Devils players
Sportspeople from Rochester, Minnesota
Wiener EV players
Wisconsin Badgers men's ice hockey players